The Israel Beetison House, located southeast of Ashland, Nebraska, was built in 1874.  It was listed on the National Register of Historic Places in 1977, and was delisted in 2023.

Its 1976 NRHP nomination states that it "stands as one of the fine examples of the Italianate style of architecture in Nebraska. Due to the economic hardship associated with the settlement of a wilderness territory, the Greek and Gothic Revivals saw very little development in Nebraska before they had passed out of favor. The Italianate was probably the first style in the state to gain widespread popularity."

The house has been destroyed in a fire on April 12, 2022.
The house was demolished on May 2 2022

References

External links

National Register of Historic Places in Saunders County, Nebraska
Italianate architecture in Nebraska
Houses completed in 1874
Former National Register of Historic Places in Nebraska